The following is the list of episodes from the anime adaptation of the manga series Itazura na Kiss. The anime adaptation is distinct from the manga itself. It is revealed that the intended finale of the manga by the late author Kaoru Tada will be conceptualized in the anime for the first time with plot details provided by her husband.

Overview 

The anime contains 25 episodes. The episodes are directed by Osamu Yamazaki and produced by TMS Entertainment. The episodes started airing on 4 April 2008 on TBS. Subsequently, Sun TV began airing the episodes from 15 April 2008 and Chubu-Nippon Broadcasting Co., Ltd on 9 April 2008.

As the manga only ran until volume 23, the ending remained unfinished. The anime adaption after episode 22 is not included in the unfinished manga.

Three pieces of theme music are used for the episodes; one opening theme and two ending themes. The opening theme, "Kimi, Meguru, Boku” is performed by Motohiro Hata. The first ending theme, “Kataomoi Fighter” is sung by GO!GO!7188, while the second ending theme, “Jikan yo Tomare” is performed by AZU featuring Seamo starting in episode 13. The song was also featured briefly during episode 10.

Anime adaptation episode list

References

External links 
 
 Official "Itazura na Kiss" (TV anime) website 
 Itazura na Kiss anime adaptation announced

Itazura na Kiss
Itazura na Kiss